Étude Op. 25, No. 3, in F major, is a technical study composed by Frédéric Chopin in 1836. The romanticized nickname of this piece (not given by Chopin, who thought that idea was repulsive) is "The Horseman" or "The Knight", probably because of its "galloping" style. It is mostly a study in rhythm. The study has four different voices that must be brought out by the performer. The technical figure consists of lateral movements of the hand that must be played with flourish and refinement.

References

External links 

 
 Op. 25, No. 3 played by Alfred Cortot
 Op. 25, No. 3 played by Claudio Arrau
 Op. 25, No. 3 played by Paul Badura-Skoda
 Op. 25, No. 3 played by Vladimir Ashkenazy
 Op. 25, No. 3 played by Maurizio Pollini
 Op. 25, No. 3 played by Murray Perahia

25 03
1836 compositions
Compositions in F major